Iron & Wine live at the Bonnaroo Music Festival, Manchester, TN, June 11, 2005.

Track listing

Disc one
 "Sunset Soon Forgotten"
 "Jezebel"
 "Woman King"
 "Free Until They Cut Me Down"
 "Cinder and Smoke"
 "Evening on the Ground (Lilith's Song)" 
 "Love and Some Verses"
 "Bird Stealing Bread"
 "Mr. Soul" (Buffalo Springfield/Neil Young cover)
 "The Night Descending"

Disc two
 "Naked as We Came"
 "Fever Dream"
 "On Your Wings"
 "Freedom Hangs Like Heaven"
 "Upward Over the Mountain"
 "Teeth in the Grass"
 "Southern Anthem"
 "My Lady's House"
 "The Trapeze Swinger"

Iron & Wine albums
2005 live albums